Vasilije "Vasa" Čarapić, known as the Dragon from Avala (1768–1806) and Vasso Tscharapitsch was a Serbian voivode (military commander) that participated in the First Serbian Uprising of the Serbian Revolution against the Ottoman Empire.

Biography

Vasa Čarapić was born in 1768, in the village of Beli Potok, under the Avala mountain. His family was originally from the Kuči tribe in Montenegro, and they got an interesting nickname that turned into a surname when one of his ancestors accidentally killed a Turk's dog, and the Turk demanded 500 groschens compensation for his pet. When the family collected the money, one of his ancestors sent the money in a čarapa (a sock) instead of a bag. It was from then on that the name Čarapić stuck as a surname.

Serbian Free Corps
Vasa Čarapić participated in Kočina Krajina as a Freikorps. In the war between Turkey and Austria, Vasa fought as a volunteer against the Turks. On that occasion, he was distinguished by exceptional heroism, so he gained a great reputation. That is why he was elected the prince of the Grocka nahija (municipality) at the nahija assembly. Vasa was also known for one thing - great hatred towards the Turks, which became proverbial.

In 1804, just before the winter, the Dahijas were preparing to start cutting down the Serbian princes, and Vasa, after learning about that, fled to Avala with two other Čarapićs. When the Belgrade Turks came to Beli Potok to look for him, he attacked and drove them away. Shortly afterwards, the Turks killed Vasa's brother Marko Čarapić in Kaludjerica.

Hajduk 
Then he burned the Turkish khan and defected to the hajduks. He spent one hard winter in the mountains and barely survived. It is said that, when the mountain began to leaf, he put a silver coin in the first leafy tree he saw, fired his pistol and exclaimed with joy: "Well, now Turo, Vasa is gaining wings!"

He gathered around him a company of brave men in the fight against the Turks. The name of Vase Čarapić became especially famous when he intercepted a Turkish kardžalija (caravan) near Leštane, and gained a great treasure. He distributed everything he received among the people.

Uprising 
After the beginning of the uprising, he became one of the main military leaders, and Karađorđe appreciated him so much that he was one of the few who dared to enter his tent unannounced. According to a legend, he was a little deaf, but even in his sleep, when he heard someone say the word Turks, he jumped, took his rifle and aimed ready to fire.

Deaths 
In 1806, Karađorđe hesitated whether to go to Belgrade or not. However, at the urging of Vasa Čarapić himself, he decided to attack. The other elders did not believe that it was possible to conquer Belgrade, but Vasa knew the circumstances well and persuaded Karađorđe to strike. The attack began at dawn on 29 November with a lightning strike by Serbs inside the walls. Vasa and 3,000 of his soldiers attacked a trench near the Stambol Gate, approximately at the beginning of Skadarska ulica (street), however, when he ran towards the Stambol Gate and shouted: "Follow me, brothers!" A Turkish bullet struck him down but he was still conscious and able to speak.
 
He said then -- "Behold, a dog has eaten me, and his law! ... Don't be afraid! Here is Čamdžija singing!"—encouraging his comrades-in-arms. At that very moment, Milosav Čamdžija mounted a Turkish cannon on the rampart and sang out loud upon hearing Vasa. Čarapić was immediately transferred to Karađorđe's tent, where he fought for his life for another two hours, but then he died. Before his death, he called his brother Tanasije Čarapić and told him to bury him in the cemetery on the property of the monastery of Rakovica. His wish was fulfilled, and a monument to King Peter I of Serbia was erected a century later (1910).

The people of Belgrade named the street from Trg republike to Studentski trg as part of the heroes. The monument to Vasa Čarapić is right at the place where he died, not far from the street named after him.

Interesting facts 
In the 1955 film "Poem from Kumbara", which talks about the siege of the occupation of Belgrade, Vasa Carapić is played by Vasa Pantelić. The film shows the death of the duke with his famous sentence.

Legacy
In Belgrade, there is a monument to Vasa Čarapić at the spot where he was killed in front of the National Theatre, and nearby is the street (Улица Васе Чарапића) that was named after him.

See also
 List of Serbian Revolutionaries

References

Literature

Barbara Jelavich, History of the Balkans: Eighteenth and nineteenth centuries
Vojna enciklopedija, Beograd, 1970., knjiga prva
Биографија Васе Чарапића

1768 births
1806 deaths
People of the First Serbian Uprising
Serbian revolutionaries
19th-century Serbian people
Serbian military personnel killed in action
Burials at Serbian Orthodox monasteries and churches